Henry Ellsworth Barbour (March 8, 1877 – March 21, 1945) was an American lawyer and politician who served six terms as a U.S. Representative from California from 1919 to 1931.

Biography 
Born in Ogdensburg, St. Lawrence County, New York, Barbour attended the public schools of his native city, the local "Free Academy" at Ogdensburg, Union College at Schenectady, New York, and the law department of George Washington University, Washington, D.C.
He was admitted to the New York bar in 1901 and moved to Fresno, California, in 1902 to engage in the practice of law.

Barbour was elected as a Republican to the Sixty-sixth and to the six succeeding Congresses (March 4, 1919 – March 3, 1933). He was an unsuccessful candidate for reelection in 1932 to the Seventy-third Congress.
He resumed the practice of his profession in Fresno, California, where he died on March 21, 1945.
He was interred in Belmont Memorial Park.

Legacy 
In the 1932 Republican Primary election for California's 7th Congressional District, Henry Barbour tied for the Republican nomination with Glenn M. Devore of Fresno, and won the nomination in an unprecedented drawing. Barbour later went on to lose this election.

In 2018, an Arizona man discovered a collection of 200 letters that had belonged to Barbour, including two letters signed by President Hoover, White House invitations from President Harding, and an invitation to the groundbreaking ceremonies for the Golden Gate Bridge.

References

1877 births
1945 deaths
People from Ogdensburg, New York
Union College (New York) alumni
George Washington University Law School alumni
Republican Party members of the United States House of Representatives from California